Nyanga may mean:

Nyanga Province, of Gabon
Nyanga River, in Gabon and Congo
Nyanga people, an ethnic group from Congo
Nyanga, Zimbabwe, a town
Nyanga District, Zimbabwe
Nyanga National Park in Zimbabwe
Nyanga, Western Cape, a township in South Africa
Nyanga language (ISO 639/3 code nyj)
Nyanga-li language (ISO 639/3 code nyc)

People with the surname
Gaspar Yanga (AKA Gaspar Nyanga), leader of a slave revolt in colonial Mexico
Yannick Nyanga, French rugby union player